The following is a list of mayors of the city of Rivne, Ukraine. It includes positions equivalent to mayor, such as chairperson of the city council executive committee.

Mayors

Russian empire
 DI Kwasniewski (Д. І. Кваснєвський), 1891-1896
 Yablonovsky (Яблоновський), 1896-1898
 OM Bukhovich (О. М. Бухович), 1898-1911
 EP Lebedievsky (Е. П. Лебедзієвський), 1911-1917
 MP Tsvetaev (М. П. Цвєтаєв), 1917
 SA Trinity (С. А. Троїцький), 1918

Ukrainian People's Republic
  (Федір Сумневич), 1917-1918

Second Polish Republic
 E. Dzikovsky (Є. Дзіковський), 1919
 Jan Balinski (Ян Балінський), 1919
 Sergey V. Matusevich (Сергій В. Матусевич), 1920
  (Кароль Балінський), 1920–1922, 1925-1927
 Jan Lisakowski (Ян Лісаковський), 1922
  (Адам Осташевський), 1922-1924
 J. Romishevsky (Й. Ромішевський), 1924-1925
 Vladimir Artsemanovich (Володимир Арцеманович), 1927-1929
 Vladimir Boyarsky (Володимир Боярський), 1929-1932
 Tomasz Tsalun (Томаш Цалун), 1932-1934
 Ludwik Rzeszowski (Людвік Ржешовський), 1934-1935
 Stanislav Volk (Станіслав Волк), 1935-1939

Soviet Union
  (Іван Білецький), 1939-1941

Third Reich
 Polycarp Potato (Полікарп Бульба), 1941-1944

Soviet Union
 Mykola Taratuta (Taratuto) (Микола Таратута (Таратуто)), 1944
 Chernyavsky (Чернявський), 1944
 Nikita Klyakhin (Микита Кляхін), 1944-1945
 Pavel Prokofiev (Павло Прокоф'єв), 1945
 Anatoliy Marchenko (Анатолій Марченко), 1945-1948
 Petro Sivolap (Петро Сиволап), 1948
  (Феодосій Додь), 1948-1949
 Tikhin Denisenko (Тихін Денисенко), 1949
 Mykola Baranchuk (Микола Баранчук), 1949-1951
  (Василь Романенко), 1951-1958
 Gregory Shchepilkin (Григорій Щепілкін), 1958-1960
  (Лаврентій Казьмерчук), 1960-1963
 Alexey Martinov (Олексій Мартинов), 1963
 Dmitry Gayovy (Дмитро Гайовий), 1963-1968
  (Олексій Користін), 1968-1981
  (Віктор Чайка), 1981-1988
 Andriy Markov (Андрій Марков), 1988-1990

Ukraine
 Ivan Fedov (Іван Федів), 1990-1993
  (Володимир Мороз), 1993-1998
 Victor Chaika, 1998-2008
 Yuri Torgun (Юрій Торгун), 2008
  (Володимир Хомко), 2008-2020 
  (Олександр Третяк), 2020-

See also
 Rivne history
 History of Rivne (in Ukrainian)

References

This article incorporates information from the Polish Wikipedia and Ukrainian Wikipedia.

History of Rivne Oblast
Rivne